The Port of Wakkanai (稚内港) is a major port located in the Municipality of Wakkanai, Hokkaido Prefecture, Japan. Sakhalin lies about 62.81 kilometers (39.03 mi) to the north. Many ferries that go/come to/from Rishiri Island, Rebun Island and Sakhalin in Russia stop. It is also a distribution center for industrial materials and essential items for residents in the North of Hokkaido. Otherwise, the port is a base for inshore and offshore fisheries, and the port plays a role in Sakhalin-III. In 2007, the port was registered as Minato Oasis (みなとオアシス), and it was named "Minato Oasis Wakkanai" (みなとオアシスわっかない) by the Ministry of Land, Infrastructure, Transport and Tourism.

Lanes 
These lanes depart from Wakkanai International Ferry Terminal (also known as Wakkanai Ferry Terminal). It is located in the Port of Wakkanai.

History 

Wakkanai Port originated when the Matsumae Domain Lords established facilities for paying taxes during the Edo era of Japan. In the Meiji era, the port was regarded as an example of the cultivation of Hokkaido. Moreover, the port helped in developing the neighboring city of Wakkanai, which provided access to Karafuto after the Russo-Japanese War.

Sakhalin lane 
In 1989, the lanes, was commenced operating for the first time after World War II, were bound for Kholmsk where is known as "Maoka" (真岡) in Japanese. In 1991, the lanes exclusively for tourists departed for Korsakov (town) where is known as "Ōtomari" (大泊) in Japanese. However, the lanes have not been operated since 1995, and was discontinued in 2015. A new public-private sector ferry company was established by Wakkanai and the Sakhalin Shipping Company in 2016. That ferry lane has been operated between August and September.

Ground transportation 
There is a bus stop located in front of the Wakkanai Ferry Terminal, connecting it to the rest of Hokkaido.

Surrounding area 
Wakkanai Station
It takes about 7 minutes to travel from the port to Wakkanai Station on foot.

References

External links 

Wakkanai-ferry-terminal
Ferry Terminal

Wakkanai
Water transport in Japan